Andrew Sterling Hess (July 20, 1923 – May 23, 2015) was an American politician in the state of Washington. He served in the Washington House of Representatives and Washington State Senate.

References

1923 births
2015 deaths
People from Abilene, Kansas
Democratic Party members of the Washington House of Representatives
Democratic Party Washington (state) state senators